Kværndrup is a town located on the island of Funen in south Denmark, in Faaborg-Midtfyn Municipality.

Places of interest
The Egeskov Castle is located about two kilometres from the town, which dates back to the 1400s and is Kværndrup's main attraction.

In the middle of the town lies Kværndrup Church, a Romanesque church with Gothic extensions from the 15th and 16th centuries with a cross-building, tower and porch. It formerly served as a church for Egeskov Castle.

Notable people 

Michael Ahlefeldt-Laurvig-Bille (born 1965) a Danish count and landowner of Egeskov Castle near Kværndrup

References 

Cities and towns in the Region of Southern Denmark
Faaborg-Midtfyn Municipality